Michelle Schmitt (born in Detroit, Michigan) is a Singer-Songwriter, Music Producer living and working in San Francisco, California.

Career 
Schmitt began playing guitar and writing songs when she was 12 years old. She moved to San Francisco in 1977. Gifted with a soulful voice, the ability to express her feelings through her heartfelt songwriting and a talented band, Michelle delivers songs that stand the test of time. A modern 70s vibe best describes her sound, beautiful harmonies, strong, honest and intelligent lyrics. Growing up in Detroit, Michelle was exposed to great music and credits artists like Joni Mitchell, Etta James, Aretha Franklin, Tina Turner, Carole King, Eva Cassidy, Bonnie Raitt, Buffe St. Marie and Emmylou Harris for her inspiration. In 2005 Michelle was invited to contribute a song on a record featuring six Grammy winners and two Rock & Roll Hall of Famers (including Bonnie Raitt, Kenny Loggins, Bill Medley, Rosanne Cash, Johnny Cash, Rodney Crowell, Beth Neilsen Chapman and Mike & the Mechanics). Michelle worked at Sound Management in San Jose, California in the early 2000s before opening Lilysong Records in Marin County. In 2006, Michelle opened the doors to her state of the art San Francisco studio, Harrison Street Records, and opened Pine Mountain Studio (both designed by the renowned studio designer, Wes Lachot) in Alexander Valley in 2008. In 2015 Michelle purchased a new Sausalito location to spend more time doing what she loves; songwriting. Michelle is committed to giving back what has so generously been given to her and records for and performs at numerous benefit concerts, helping organizations that assist homeless adults and youth in San Francisco and Marin County, the LGBT communities both in San Francisco & Marin County, Meals on Wheels SF, ExtraFood.org, SF/Marin Food Bank, Shanti Project in San Francisco, Anti-Bullying organizations and various youth drug prevention programs. 100% of all proceeds of Michelle's music goes to causes that she cares about. Michelle produces & arranges her own records and has worked and co-produced music with her friend, Ricky Fataar. Schmitt has spent time writing with her talented friend and songwriting chair at Berklee School of Music, Bonnie Hayes, on projects as well. Schmitt has worked with musicians from San Francisco, Los Angeles, Nashville, New York, Paris and all over the Bay Area. Her band has included Ricky Fataar & George Marinelli (Bonnie Raitt), Marc Levine, Michael Bluestein (Foreigner), Michael Spriggs and Billy Shaddox, and now consists of Lewis Patzner, Jeremy Lyon, Will Lawrence, Mike Pinette, Graham Patzner, Papa Bear, Anton Patzner, and Trevor Bahnson. She has also been going to Paris to perform annually for the last 12 years.

Benefit concerts
Schmitt and her band also do benefit concerts every December in San Francisco and Marin County to raise money for the hungry in those communities. The recipients of the concerts are organization near and dear to her heart, ExtraFood.org in Marin County and Little Wishes in San Francisco

In 2020, Schmitt and her band will perform at La Boule noire in Paris and The Royal Oak Music Theatre in Detroit, Michelle's beloved hometown. Both shows will be benefit concerts.

Discography

Fearless Hearts (2004) 
Label: Hoffman Institute Foundation, Marin County, California

Track List 
 Happy Girl (Beth Nielsen Chapman)
 Fearless Love (Bonnie Raitt)
 I'll Be Here With You Til Then (Bill Medley)
 The Rose (Michelle is featured)
 The Bus Ride (Anna Willson)
 There Isn't Any Word For Love (Brent BecVar) 
 You Won't Be There (Jesse Moore)
 Conviction Of The Heart (Kenny Loggins) 
 September When It Comes (Rosanne Cash)
 Heart to Heart (John Denver)
 I Know Love Is All I Need (Rodney Crowell)
 The living Years (Mike + the Mechanics)

Faith, Love and Detroit (2004) 
Label: Red Rooster Studio, Berkeley California

Track List 
 Promises
 Don't Worry
 The Rose
 Motoring
 Lord, is it Mine?
 Clear Eyes, Clear Heart
 Devil in his Pants
 You Say
 Stairway to Heaven
 Somebody to Love
 Did I Give You Everything You Need?

Promises (2005) 
Label: Lilysong Records

Track List 
 Promises
 Way Up in Heaven
 As I Hold You in My heart
 What Do I Do?
 Clear Eyes, Clear Heart
 Hey Maybe
 I think
 For You
 I Have Found Everything In You

Home (2007) 
Label: Harrison Street Records

Track List 
 Lying In This Bed
 Home
 You're the one I Love
 Start All Over
 Tears
 Heidi’s Song
 Missing
 I Hope God Is Listening
 Holding On Tight
 You can't break My Heart

Another Winter (2008) 
Label: Harrison Street Records

Track List 
 Where To Turn
 Morning Light
 These Little Pills
 I see You
 Tonight
 We’re Both Trying
 Your Words
 You'll Know
 Shadows
 Another Winter
 As You Sleep

Christmas on Pine Mountain (2009) 
Label: Harrison Street Records

Track List 
 By The Fire
 Song For a Winter’s Night
 A Lonely Christmas Night
 Winter Song
 Breath of Heaven
 I Believe In Love
 What Child Is This
 Don't Let Go of Me
 The First Noel
 Maybe This Christmas
 Angels In Trees
 Christmas In Killarney
 Pine Mountain Lullaby

Being Here (2010) 
Label: Harrison Street Records

Track List 
 Being Here
 Love
 Tumblin’ Down
 Can't Live Without You
 Pretty Words
 We Keep Missing Each Other
 Trying Too Hard
 Anywhere With You
 If I knew
 Hurricane
 Are You Still There

Covering Life (2011) 
Label: Harrison Street Records

Track List 
 Fall Apart Again
 Love Hurst
 Goodbye
 Helplessly Hoping
 Until I Die
 Long Ride Home
 Circle Game
 I Want You Back
 Love Ain't For Keeping
 State Of Mind

Late Tonight (2012) 
Label: Harrison Street Records

Track List 
 Late Tonight
 Let Go
 More For You
 Paris
 Knowing You
 Looking Out
 Nothing
 Still Called Love
 Settled
 Time Is Speaking

Messages (2013) 
Label: Harrison Street Records

Track List 
 Messages
 Before It Breaks
 Portrait
 Falling Forward
 Last Night of the Year
 Life for Me
 Running
 Don't Want To
 Gone
 This Too Shall Pass
 Tread Softly
 When I Get Up

To Remember You (2014)
Label: Harrison Street Records

Track List
Christmas Eve
Calling On Mary
I Heard The Bells
River
Green Grows The Holly
Under A Beautiful Moon
Memories
The Heartache Can Wait
Silent Night 
To Remember You
Run Run Rudolph

Another Christmas Story(2015)
Label: Harrison Street Records

Track List
Mistletoe 
Midnight Clear
Love Is Christmas 
With Me
Another Christmas Story
St. Germain
A Change At Christmas
Christmas for Two
I'll Be Home for Christmas 
Silent Night, Holy Night
Santa Claus Is Coming to Town 
Boogie Woogie Santa Claus
Season of My Memory 
Do You Remember?

Detroit Girl (2016)
Label: Harrison Street Records

Track List
I Can't Stand the Rain
Some Kind of Wonderful
Let It Rock
I Can Only Give You Everything
Not a Love Song
Talking in Your Sleep
In the Cold Cold Night
Hula Hoop
Harvest for the World
Detroit City

San Francisco AM Sessions (2016)
Label: Harrison Street Records

Track List

Morning Light
You're the One I Love
You Can't Break My Heart
I See You
Tread Softly
As You Sleep
Nothing
Pretty Words
Tears
Tonight
Another Winter

San Francisco PM Sessions (2016)
Label: Harrison Street Records

Track List

Being Here
Tumblin' Down
Late Tonight
Home
Your Words
Trying Too Hard
Hula Hoop
Love
Running
These Little Pills
Detroit City

Christmas Gifts (2016)
Label: Harrison Street Records

Track List

At Christmas Time
2000 Miles
Something About December
It Really Is a Wonderful Life
Rockin' Around the Christmas Tree
Hey Guys, It's Christmas Time
Christmas Gifts
Finally Home
Only You
Papa Noel

Joy (2017)
Label: Harrison Street Records

Track List

All I want For Christmas Is You
I Heard the Bells On Christmas Day
All the Pretty Little Horses 
Mistletoe
Everything Is Cool
Christmas Without You
Shimmy Down the Chimney
Our Lullaby
Joy

Christmas Stories (2018)
Label: Harrison Street Records

Track List
Do You Remember?
By the Fire
I Believe in Love
With Me
Under a Beautiful Moon
St. Germain
To Remember You
Memories
Christmas Eve
Don't Let Go of Me
Pine Mountain Lullaby

St Mary's (2018)
Label: Harrison Street Records

Track List
Here We Go Again
Before I Die
St. Mary's
Loud Women
The Eye
Dignity
What Good Husbands Do
Note To Me
Want Me Happy
Tossed and Tangled
Catch Me
We Don't Leave Anyone Behind

Detroit Girl Too (2019)
Label: Harrison Street Records

Track List
Somebody to Love
Leap of Faith 
Get Ready
Stop Look Listen
What I like About You 
Take Me to the River
The Way You do the Things You Do
Borderline
Midnight Hour
Katmandu
Who Do You Love

Going Home (2019)
Label: Harrison Street Records

Track List
A Thousand Beautiful Things
Closer to Fine
Landslide
Back to Me
Falling Star
What Are You Waiting For?
Down to You
Until It's Time for You to Go
Most of All
Home

Light (2020)
Label: Harrison Street Records

Track List
Oh Mercy
Answer to My Prayers
Wouldn't Change It
Stop Time
Can't You Just Love Me
Took So Long 
Light
Our Song Was Playing
Give Away the Moon
How Much Do You Need 
I Found Everything in You (1975)

Opened Letters (2022)
Label: Harrison Street Records

Track List
Anyway
Opened Letters
Behind My Back 
Crazy Thing
Don't You Remember When? 
Drowning
Far Away 
Looking For My life
Middle Of the Night 
The Only Thing That Last 
Where Do I Begin?
Wipe Away My Tears 
You Can't Hide

Personal life
Michelle lives in Marin County, California, and has been married to Henry Schmitt since 1984. She has two sons, Eric (born 1987) and Alexander (born 1988). She also has a daughter-in-law, Kim Schmitt, married to Eric and three granddaughters as well as a son-in-law, Todd Stallings-Schmitt, married to Alex.

References

External links
Michelle Schmitt
Pacific Sun 
Benefit for ExtraFood Marin
Pacific Sun: Michelle Shares Gratitude Through Music
Bohemian: Season of Giving
8th Annual Concert benefiting ExtraFood.org
9th Annual Concert Charity Benefit
Marin Journal: Little Wishes
Marin Magazine: Singer/Songwriter Uses Her Music to Help Millions in Need

American women singer-songwriters
American women guitarists
Living people
Year of birth missing (living people)
21st-century American women
Singer-songwriters from Michigan